The Republican candidates in the 2016 United States presidential election are not all the same in their opinions. The following chart shows the different positions they hold.

Domestic policy

LGBT rights

Foreign Policy

Political ideologies

Note that some of these terms are self-identifiers (in quotation marks): the views linked to may not adequately represent all of their policy stances.

See also 
 Republican Party presidential candidates, 2016
 Political positions of the Democratic Party presidential primary candidates, 2016

References 

Republican Party
2016 United States Republican presidential primaries